James Conant is the name of:

 James B. Conant (1893–1978), American chemist and educational administrator
James B. Conant High School, a public high school in Hoffman Estates, Illinois named after James B. Conant
 James F. Conant (born 1958), American philosopher
 James Wallace Conant (1862–1906), American amusement manager for Schenley Park Casino and Duquesne Gardens